Schwerin Castle (also known as Schwerin Palace), is a schloss located in the city of Schwerin, the capital of Mecklenburg-Vorpommern state, Germany. It is situated on an island in the city's main lake, Lake Schwerin.

For centuries, the castle was the home of the dukes and grand dukes of Mecklenburg and later Mecklenburg-Schwerin. Today parts of it serve as the residence of the Mecklenburg-Vorpommern state parliament, other parts are open for tourists.

Major parts of the current castle were built between 1845 and 1857, as a cooperation of the renowned historicist architects Gottfried Semper, Friedrich August Stüler, Georg Adolf Demmler and Ernst Friedrich Zwirner. The castle is regarded as one of the most important works of romantic Historicism in Europe and is designated to become a World Heritage Site. It is nicknamed the "Neuschwanstein of the North".

History

Early years
The first records of a castle at this location date from AD 973. There was a fort of the Polabian Slav tribe of the Obotrites on an island in the large lake of Schwerin.

In 1160, the fort became a target of Germanic noblemen planning to expand their territory eastward under the leadership of Henry the Lion (1129–1195). The Obotrites under Niklot destroyed the fort but left because of the Germanic military dominance. The German conquerors, however, recognised the strategic and aesthetically interesting location of the island and started building a new fort. The foundation of the city of Schwerin took place in the same year. Schwerin became the seat of a bishopric.

In 1167, Henry gave the County of Schwerin to his vassal Gunzelin von Hagen, and the rest of the country around the city was returned to Niklot's son Pribislav, forming a hereditary ducal line that lasted until 1918. In 1358, the County of Schwerin was purchased by the descendants of Niklot, who had been elevated to Dukes of Mecklenburg in 1348. They soon relocated farther inland from Mikelenburg, near the city of Wismar, to Schwerin. During the late Gothic era, the growing prosperity and position of the dukes led to a growing need for a representative castle, and this meant architectural changes to the fortress settlement. The Bishop's House (Bischofshaus) from that period remains in a grave.

Renaissance (15th–17th centuries) 

Under John Albert I, Duke of Mecklenburg (1525–1576), the building faced important changes. The fort became a palace, and the defensive functionality of the fortress was replaced with ornamentation and concessions to comfort. The use of terracotta during the Renaissance was dominant in North German architecture, and Schwerin's terracotta was supplied from Lübeck.

A few years after reworking the main building itself, from 1560 to 1563, John Albert rebuilt the palace's chapel. It became the first new Protestant church of the state. The architecture was inspired by churches in Torgau and Dresden. The early Venetian Renaissance gate, its gable showing the carrying of the cross, was made by Hans Walther (1526–1600), a sculptor from Dresden. Windows on the northern face show biblical illustrations by well-known Flemish artist Willem van den Broecke (also known as "Paludanus"; 1530 – 1579).

As the ducal residence needed additional defences, despite its island site, some time in the middle of the 16th century bastions were established to the northwest, southwest and southeast. They were probably built by the same Italian architects who, under Francesco a Bornau, also designed the Dömitz Fortress. The bastions were later modified several times, and are still standing today.

Before the Thirty Years' War, the architect Ghert Evert Piloot, who had entered Mecklenburg's service in 1612, made plans to completely rebuild the palace in the style of the Renaissance in the Low Countries. In 1617, work began under his supervision, but soon had to cease because of the war. Piloot's plans were partially realized between 1635 and 1643: the house above the palatial kitchen and that above the chapel were razed and given Dutch Renaissance style façades.

During this period, a half-timbered building was constructed near the chapel to house the archducal collection of paintings. Also, the Teepavillon (tea house) was built. The court moved to Schloss Ludwigslust in 1756.

Recent times (since the 19th century) 
In 1837, the ducal residence moved back to Schwerin, but the building was in relatively bad condition, and the Grand Duke disliked the individual buildings' incongruent origins and architectural styles.

Grand Duke Friedrich (1800–1842) instructed his architect Georg Adolph Demmler (1804–1886) to remodel the palace. However a few months later, construction was halted by his successor, Friedrich Franz II (1823–1883), who wanted a complete reconstruction of the historic site. Only some parts of the building dating from the 16th and 17th centuries were retained.

Dresden architect Gottfried Semper (1803–1879) and Berlin architect Friedrich August Stüler (1800–1865) could not convince the Grand Duke of their plans. Instead, Demmler included elements of both of them into his plan, but found inspiration in French Renaissance castles. The castle became the most admired masterpiece of the student of Karl Friedrich Schinkel. He also planned a government building in 1825–1826 located at Schlossstraße (today the State Chancellery). Renaissance châteaux of the Loire Valley (such as Chambord) also inspired him and contributed to the construction from 1843 until 1851. His successor Stüler again made a few alterations, and included an equestrian statue of Niklot and the cupola.

Heinrich Strack (1805–1880) from Berlin was chosen for the interior design. Most of the work was carried out by craftsmen from Schwerin and Berlin. A fire destroyed about a third of the palace in December 1913. Only the exterior reconstruction had been completed when the revolution of 1918 resulted in the abdication of the Grand Duke. The castle later became a museum and in 1948 the seat of the state parliament. The German Democratic Republic used the palace as a college for kindergarten teachers from 1952 to 1981. Then it was a museum again until 1993. The Orangerie had been a technical museum since 1961. From 1974 on, some renovated rooms were used as an art museum.

Since late 1990, it is once again a seat of government, as the seat of the Landtag (the state assembly of the State of Mecklenburg-Vorpommern). Since then there have been massive preservation and renovation efforts. Most of these were finished by 2019.

Ghost of Petermännchen
The palace's ghost Petermännchen ("little Peterman") is said to roam the halls of the Schweriner Schloss. This invisible little creature is said to be no more than a few feet high, and is often depicted in clothes from the 17th century, something resembling a cavalier.  Other legends describe him as a long-bearded blacksmith, night watchman, or prankster to those who would seek to harm or steal from the castle.

Gallery

References

External links

Schwerin Visitor Website about Schwerin Palace (English)
State Parliament of Mecklenburg-Vorpommern (German)
Webcam Schwerin Palace

Houses completed in 1563
Houses completed in 1857
Buildings and structures in Schwerin
Museums in Mecklenburg-Western Pomerania
Historic house museums in Germany
Gardens in Mecklenburg-Western Pomerania
Decorative arts museums in Germany
Water castles in Germany
Historicist architecture in Germany
Palaces in Mecklenburg-Western Pomerania
Legislative buildings in Europe
German Landtag buildings
Royal residences in Mecklenburg-Western Pomerania